Layin' in the Cut is the third studio album by A Lighter Shade of Brown. It was released on July 26, 1994, for Mercury Records and was produced by Jammin' James Carter, DJ Romeo and Stoker. Layin' in the Cut would prove to be the duo's most successful on the Billboard charts, peaking at #54 on the Top R&B/Hip-Hop Albums and #169 on the Billboard 200. Two singles also made it to the charts, "Hey DJ" peaked at #43 on the Billboard Hot 100 and #18 on the Hot Rap Singles, while "If You Wanna Groove" featuring Aulsondro "Novelist" Hamilton peaked at #45 on the Hot Rap Singles. This was A Lighter Shade of Brown's last album to make it to the charts.

Track listing
 "Dip into My Ride" – 4:37
 "Where Ya At?" – 4:12
 "Talkin' 'Bout (Gettin' It On)" – 5:04
 "Hey DJ" (Remix) – 3:35
 "Playin' in the Shade" – 3:43
 "If You Wanna Groove" (featuring Novelist) – 3:44
 "I Like It" – 4:26
 "Things Ain't the Same" – 4:10
 "Doin' the Same Thing" – 3:46
 "Everyday All Day" – 3:57
 "Hey DJ" – 3:59

Charts

References

External links

1994 albums
A Lighter Shade of Brown albums